The Bloomfield Falls (Aboriginal: Wujal Wujal) is a cascade waterfall on the Bloomfield River near Cape Tribulation, close to Wujal Wujal, that is located in the UNESCO World Heritagelisted Daintree National Park in Queensland, Australia.

Features and location
The traditional custodians of the land surrounding the Bloomfield Falls are the Indigenous Australian Kuku Yalanji clan.

Access to the waterfall is provided via the Bloomfield Track, south of Cooktown. In the wet season it is not possible to visit the falls.

See also

 List of waterfalls of Queensland

References

Waterfalls of Far North Queensland
Cascade waterfalls